Nancy Anne Denton is an American sociologist. She is a professor of sociology at the University at Albany, SUNY, where she Professor Emeritus. SUNY Albany, where Dr. Havidan Rodriguez (a noted Sociologist) is currently the president of the university. She is known for her research on racial segregation in the United States with Douglas Massey, with whom she co-authored the book American Apartheid. A book, well reviewed by the Los Angeles Times, when first published. Upon retiring from SUNY Albany, she received the Robert and Helen Lynd Lifetime Achievement Award from the Community and Urban Sociology section from the American Sociological Association  Works at Stanford Center on Poverty & Inequality

References

External links
Faculty page 

Living people
American sociologists
University at Albany, SUNY faculty
Le Moyne College alumni
Fordham University alumni
University of Pennsylvania alumni
American women social scientists
American women sociologists
Year of birth missing (living people)
21st-century American women